Developmental Psychobiology is a peer-reviewed scientific journal, established in 1968 and currently published by John Wiley & Sons on behalf of the International Society for Developmental Psychobiology. It covers research on all aspects of behavioral development in animals and humans.

Abstracting and indexing 
The journal is abstracted and indexed in:

According to the Journal Citation Reports, the journal has a 2020 impact factor of 3.038.

References

External links 
 
 International Society for Developmental Psychobiology

Developmental psychology journals
Publications established in 1968
Wiley (publisher) academic journals
English-language journals